The men's singles of the 2013 Prague Open by Advantage Cars tournament was played on clay in Prague, Czech Republic.

Horacio Zeballos was the defending champion but decided not to participate.
Oleksandr Nedovyesov won the first edition of the event by defeating Javier Martí 6–0, 6–1 in the final.

Seeds

Draw

Finals

Top half

Bottom half

References
 Main Draw
 Qualifying Draw

Prague Open - Singles
2013 - Singles